Ron Mendive (born in Elko, Nevada) is an American politician, serving as an Idaho State Representative since 2012. A member of the Republican Party, Mendive represents District 3 in the A seat.

Education
Mendive graduated from Kellogg High School, and attended North Idaho College.

Idaho House of Representatives

Committee assignments
Education Committee
Environment, Energy, and Technology Committee
Resources and Conservation Committee
Mendive previously served on the Commerce and Human Resources Committee from 2012 to 2014.

Elections

References

External links
Ron Mendive at the Idaho Legislature
Campaign site
 

Year of birth missing (living people)
Living people
Republican Party members of the Idaho House of Representatives
People from Coeur d'Alene, Idaho
People from Elko, Nevada
21st-century American politicians